The McCook Generals were a Nebraska State League baseball team based in McCook, Nebraska, United States that existed from 1928 to 1932. They were league champions in their first three years of existence, from 1929 to 1931. All league championships came while Doc Bennett was manager. The Generals were succeeded in McCook by the McCook Braves in 1956 and preceded by the McCook team of the 1903 Central Nebraska League.

Timeline

References

Baseball teams established in 1928
Defunct minor league baseball teams
Baseball teams disestablished in 1932
1928 establishments in Nebraska
1932 disestablishments in Nebraska
Defunct baseball teams in Nebraska
Nebraska State League teams